
Gmina Kurzętnik is a rural gmina (administrative district) in Nowe Miasto County, Warmian-Masurian Voivodeship, in northern Poland.

The gmina contains part of the protected area called Brodnica Landscape Park.

Villages
Gmina Kurzętnik contains the villages and settlements of Bratuszewo, Brzozie Lubawskie, Kąciki, Kacze Bagno, Kamionka, Krzemieniewo, Kurzętnik, Lipowiec, Małe Bałówki, Marzęcice, Mikołajki, Nielbark, Ostrówki, Otręba, Rygiel, Sugajenko, Szafarnia, Tereszewo, Tomaszewo, Wawrowice and Wielkie Bałówki.

Neighbouring gminas
Gmina Kurzętnik is bordered by the gminas of Biskupiec, Brzozie, Grodziczno, Nowe Miasto Lubawskie and Zbiczno.

References
Polish official population figures 2006

Kurzetnik
Nowe Miasto County